Linn County is one of the 36 counties in the U.S. state of Oregon. As of the 2020 census, the population was 128,610. The county seat is Albany. The county is named in honor of Lewis F. Linn, a U.S. Senator from Missouri who advocated the American settlement of the Oregon Country. Linn County comprises the Albany, OR Metropolitan Statistical Area, which is included in the Portland-Vancouver-Salem, OR-WA Combined Statistical Area. It is located in the Willamette Valley. In 2010, the center of population of Oregon was located in Linn County, near the city of Lyons.

History
On December 28, 1847 the Provisional Legislature created Linn County from the southern portion of Champoeg (later Marion) County. The boundaries were altered in 1851 and 1854 with the creation of Lane and Wasco Counties. The county seat was originally located in Calapooia (later known as Brownsville), but in 1851 the Territorial Legislature passed an act establishing Albany as the county seat. A special election in 1856 reaffirmed Albany as the county seat.

Geography

Adjacent counties
 Polk County (northwest)
 Marion County (north)
 Jefferson County (east)
 Deschutes County (southeast)
 Lane County (south)
 Benton County (west)

National protected area
Willamette National Forest (part)

Demographics

2000 census
As of the census of 2000, there were 103,069 people, 39,541 households, and 28,232 families living in the county.  The population density was 45 people per square mile (17/km2).  There were 42,521 housing units at an average density of 19 per square mile (7/km2).  The racial makeup of the county was 93.20% White, 0.32% Black or African American, 1.27% Native American, 0.78% Asian, 0.15% Pacific Islander, 1.80% from other races, and 2.49% from two or more races. 4.38% of the population were Hispanic or Latino of any race. 22.2% were of German, 13.0% American, 11.2% English and 8.6% Irish ancestry.

There were 39,541 households, out of which 32.00% had children under the age of 18 living with them, 56.90% were married couples living together, 10.00% had a female householder with no husband present, and 28.60% were non-families. 23.00% of all households were made up of individuals, and 10.10% had someone living alone who was 65 years of age or older.  The average household size was 2.58 and the average family size was 3.01.

In the county, the population was spread out, with 26.00% under the age of 18, 8.40% from 18 to 24, 27.00% from 25 to 44, 24.10% from 45 to 64, and 14.50% who were 65 years of age or older.  The median age was 37 years. For every 100 females there were 97.50 males.  For every 100 females age 18 and over, there were 95.00 males.

The median income for a household in the county was $37,518, and the median income for a family was $44,188. Males had a median income of $35,586 versus $24,073 for females. The per capita income for the county was $17,633.  About 8.90% of families and 11.40% of the population were below the poverty line, including 14.80% of those under age 18 and 7.10% of those age 65 or over.

2010 census
As of the 2010 census, there were 116,672 people, 45,204 households, and 30,976 families living in the county. The racial makeup of the county was 90.6% white, 1.3% American Indian, 1.0% Asian, 0.5% black or African American, 0.1% Pacific islander, 3.3% from other races, and 3.3% from two or more races. Those of Hispanic or Latino origin made up 7.8% of the population. In terms of ancestry, 22.9% were German, 14.1% were English, 12.7% were Irish, and 7.1% were American.

Of the 45,204 households, 32.1% had children under age 18 living with them, 52.1% were married couples living together, 11.2% had a female householder with no husband present, 31.5% were non-families, and 24.4% of all households were made up of individuals. The average household size was 2.55 and the average family size was 3.01. The median age was 39.2 years.

The median income for a household in the county was $45,832 and the median income for a family was $55,320. Males had a median income of $44,450 versus $32,055 for females. The per capita income for the county was $22,165. About 11.0% of families and 15.6% of the population were below the poverty line, including 23.0% of those under age 18 and 7.8% of those age 65 or over.

2020 Census
The racial makeup of the county was 81% non-hispanic white, .5% African American, 1% Native American, 1.1% Asian, 5.9% of two or more races, and 9.8% Hispanic.

Government and politics
Linn County has only supported a Democrat for president four times since 1920, and only twice since 1940.  Jimmy Carter is the last Democrat to carry the county, in 1976. In 2012 Mitt Romney won 56.28 percent to incumbent president Obama's 39.63 percent, and Obama's 2008 result of 42.64 percent is the best by a Democrat since Michael Dukakis in a 1988 election affected by a major drought.

In January 2013, Linn County Sheriff Tim Mueller gained national attention for a letter he sent to Vice-President Joe Biden, informing Mr. Biden that he [Mueller] would not enforce any federal firearms laws he considered to be "offending the constitutional rights of my citizens." He further stated that he would not permit federal officers to come to his county to enforce such laws. A copy of the letter may be seen on the Linn County Sheriff's Department Facebook page.

Economy
Principal industries are wood products, agriculture, mining, and manufacturing. Linn County's economy relies heavily on the lumber and wood products industry; in 1990, this industry accounted for 40% of the county's manufacturing jobs. The climate and soil conditions provide one of Oregon's most diversified agriculture areas, allowing a wide variety of specialty crops such as common and perennial ryegrass. Linn County is also home to the only emery mine in the United States, and the production of manufactured and motor homes.

Natural history
A variety of flora and fauna occur in Linn County. Fauna include mammals, birds, amphibians and reptiles. Trees include a variety of oaks and conifers as well as other species such as Salix sessilifolia. The Rough-skinned Newt is a common amphibian occurring in the oak woodlands of the county.

Carpenter Mountain, one of the highest points in the western Cascades is located in Linn County, although road access to the peak is only possible through Lane County.

Communities

Cities

Albany (county seat) (part)
Brownsville
Gates (part)
Halsey
Harrisburg
Idanha (part)
Lebanon
Lyons
Mill City (part)
Millersburg
Scio
Sodaville
Sweet Home
Tangent
Waterloo

Census-designated places

Cascadia
Crabtree
Crawfordsville
Holley
Lacomb
Peoria
Shedd
South Lebanon
West Scio

Unincorporated communities
Calapooia
Foster
Fox Valley
Jordan
Kingston
Marion Forks
Riverside
Santiam Junction
Berlin

See also
 National Register of Historic Places listings in Linn County, Oregon
 USS Linn County (LST-900)

References

Further reading

External links
 

 
1847 establishments in Oregon Country
Populated places established in 1847